Abagrotis rubricundis is a moth of the family Noctuidae. It is found in the mountains of California and south-western Oregon.

The wingspan is about 38 mm.

External links
Photo of Adult

rubricundis
Moths of North America
Moths described in 1968